Phenix Baptist Church is a church at 2 Fairview Avenue in West Warwick, Rhode Island, USA. The church's 1869 building, once listed on the National Register of Historic Places, has been demolished. The church has been rebuilt twice and celebrated its 175th anniversary on January 8, 2017.

References

External links
Official Website (church)

Churches completed in 1869
19th-century Baptist churches in the United States
Churches on the National Register of Historic Places in Rhode Island
Buildings and structures in West Warwick, Rhode Island
Churches in Kent County, Rhode Island
1869 establishments in Rhode Island
National Register of Historic Places in Kent County, Rhode Island
Former National Register of Historic Places in Rhode Island